Eacles oslari, or Oslar's eacles, is a moth of the family Saturniidae. It is found from the Santa Rita, Patagonia, Atascosa and Huachuca mountains of southern Arizona south into Sonora, Sinaloa and Chihuahua in Mexico. Wings vary from yellow to purple brown. The species was first described by Walter Rothschild in 1907.

The wingspan 112–146 mm. Adults are on wing from July to August. They are vulnerable to predation from bats.

The larvae feed on Quercus oblongifolia, Quercus emoryi and Sapindus saponaria drummondii.

References

External links

Ceratocampinae
Moths described in 1907
Lepidoptera of Mexico